Charles Horace Upton (August 23, 1812 – June 17, 1877) was a nineteenth-century politician from Massachusetts and Virginia.

Biography
Born in Salem, Massachusetts, Upton attended the public schools as a child and went on to graduate from Bowdoin College in Brunswick, Maine. He moved to Falls Church, Virginia in 1836 and engaged in agricultural and literary pursuits. He held several local offices before being elected a Unionist to the United States House of Representatives in 1861, serving until 1862 when the House declared he was not entitled to the seat.

In 1863, President Abraham Lincoln appointed Upton consul to Switzerland, which he served as until his death on June 17, 1877 in Geneva, Switzerland. He was interred in Congressional Cemetery in Washington, D.C..

External links

 Retrieved on 2009-03-31

Charles H. Upton at The Political Graveyard

1812 births
1877 deaths
Politicians from Salem, Massachusetts
Unionist Party members of the United States House of Representatives from Virginia
People of Virginia in the American Civil War
Bowdoin College alumni
Burials at the Congressional Cemetery
Politicians from Falls Church, Virginia
Virginia Unionists
American consuls
19th-century American politicians
Republican Party members of the United States House of Representatives from Virginia